You Can't Do That on Stage Anymore is the collective title of several live albums by Frank Zappa, comprising:

You Can't Do That on Stage Anymore, Vol. 1
You Can't Do That on Stage Anymore, Vol. 2
You Can't Do That on Stage Anymore, Vol. 3
You Can't Do That on Stage Anymore, Vol. 4
You Can't Do That on Stage Anymore, Vol. 5
You Can't Do That on Stage Anymore, Vol. 6

Frank Zappa